Landmark Mall is a shopping mall located in Al Gharrafa in Doha, Qatar.

Circus Land
Circus Land is designed like a circus and a fair, including a horse carousel, a red baron airplane flyover, an inflatable slide, trampoline beds, bumper cars and four-storey soft play area form the main attractions at Circus Land, which has a separate food court area and various kid shopping options. Cinema Land, housed within Circus Land at Landmark Mall, has three theatres to catch a play, concert or movie premiere.

Stores

Landmark elaborates a variety of stores:
LELAS Perfumes (Perfumes)
OSMANLI OUD Perfumes (Perfumes)
CERRUTI 1881 (Luxury Watches, Accessories and perfumes)
POLICE (Luxury Watches, Accessories and perfumes)
Carrefour (supermarket)
Virgin Megastore (electronics shop)
Mango (clothing)
Salsa (clothing)
Karen Millen (woman's clothing shop)
H&M (men and women clothing shop)
Oysho (clothing &retail company)
Evans (clothing)
MAC Cosmetics
Pull & Bear (clothing)
Zara Home (house store)
Oculus VR
Lush (cosmetic shop)
Claires (fashion accessories)
Bhs (clothing)
Cath Kidstone (fashion accessories)
Furla (fashion accessories)
Swarovski (jewelry)
Boots (pharmacy)
Lacoste (clothing)
The body shop (cosmetic shop)
Stradivarius (clothing shop)

References

Shopping malls in Doha
Shopping malls established in 2000